Irving Moskowitz (January 11, 1928 – June 16, 2016) was an American physician, businessman, and activist. His activism, in part, sought to create a Jewish majority in Palestinian Arab neighborhoods of East Jerusalem by purchasing land.

Biography
Irving Moskowitz was the ninth of thirteen children born to Jewish immigrants from Poland. He has stated that 120 of his relatives were murdered in the Holocaust. He grew up in Milwaukee, Wisconsin and received a medical degree from the University of Wisconsin. He then moved to California where he started his medical practice, later building and managing hospitals. He started the foundation in 1968. At the time of his death Moskowitz resided in Miami Beach, Florida.

Moskowitz was married to Cherna with whom he raised 8 children, over 48 grandchildren and over 20 great grandchildren. Among his notable Zionist activities was establishing a foundation to help Shinlung immigration to Israel. The family also established the Moskowitz Prize for Zionism in 2008.

He built a business running hospitals and legal gambling in California. He was the founder of the Moskowitz Foundation, created "to help people in need regardless of race, creed, politics or religion." The foundation raises funds for Jewish housing projects in  East Jerusalem through its charity bingo hall in Hawaiian Gardens, California. The funding is channeled through two settler organizations El'ad and Ateret Cohanim that work to create a Jewish majority in  Palestinian neighborhoods of East Jerusalem.

Moskowitz had battled Alzheimer's disease for many years and eventually succumbed to it on June 16, 2016 at the age of 88.

Housing projects
In 2007, Moskowitz worked toward resettling Jews in Palestinian neighborhoods in East Jerusalem vis a vis initiating plans to build 122 apartments on the site of the Shepherd Hotel in the Sheikh Jarrah neighborhood. The plan was downsized in 2009. Final approval was given for 20 apartments on March 23, 2010, hours before Prime Minister Benjamin Netanyahu met with President Barack Obama at the White House. The historic Shepherd Hotel was torn down to make room for the housing units. A three-story parking garage and an access road was also planned for the site.

Philanthropy
Moskowitz was the founder and chair of the Irving I. Moskowitz Foundation, which donated  $1.5 million to Hawaiian Gardens, California for the construction of the Fedde Middle School Sports Complex, the first state-of-the-art sports facility in the city. He donated to Karl Rove's American Crossroads, the Center for Security Policy and the Western Center for Journalism.  The Irving Moskowitz Foundation donated $100,000 on March 17, 2011, to the American Red Cross for the 2011 Tōhoku earthquake and tsunami relief efforts.  On June 26, 2013, The Irving Moskowitz Foundation donated $100,000 to the American Red Cross for Oklahoma relief efforts. On November 21, 2013, the Irving I. Moskowitz Foundation presented a check for $100,000 to the American Red Cross Long Beach Chapter to aid the victims of Typhoon Haiyan in the Philippines.

References

External links
 Moskowitz Foundation Home Page
 Irving Moskowitz Home Page
 Irving I Moskowitz Foundation on GuideStar
 The Moskowitz Prize for Zionism

1928 births
2016 deaths
American casino industry businesspeople
American construction businesspeople
American health care businesspeople
American nonprofit businesspeople
American Orthodox Jews
American people of Polish-Jewish descent
American real estate businesspeople
American Zionists
Businesspeople from California
Businesspeople from Miami
Businesspeople from New York City
Businesspeople from Milwaukee
Jewish American philanthropists
Jewish physicians
People from Miami Beach, Florida
Philanthropists from New York (state)
Physicians from Florida
University of Wisconsin School of Medicine and Public Health alumni
20th-century American businesspeople
20th-century American philanthropists
21st-century American Jews